The National Students Federation Pakistan (NSF) is a left-wing students federation in Pakistan. In the late 1960s, NSF adopted the political line of Marxism–Leninism and Mao Zedong Thought. 

Its predecessor, the DSF (Democratic Students Federation), had links to the Communist Party of Pakistan. It had power base among progressive students from Dow Medical and DJ Science Colleges. It dominated student politics in Karachi, the then Federal Capital of the country. In a convention at the national level of students, held in Khaliqdina Hall, Karachi(1953), the DSF renamed itself to NSF (National Student Federation in the late 1960s), laying claim to being a national movement and hoping to spread the Student Revolution to the whole country. Demonstrations and strikes had already paralysed the federal capital for several days. The government apparently gave in by sacrificing the federal minister of education, Mr Fazlur Rahman, hailing from the eastern wing. He was sacked from his post. It was not much of a victory for the students. APSO was banned and the leaders were thrown in Karachi Central Jail. NSF (The National Students Federation) a small nationalist and right-wing group which had been propped up by the help of Karachi University Vice Chancellor to counter DSF's activities, was invaded practically overnight by the now banned DSF party members, who were still outside. The ex-DSFites had enough muscle and organisational skills to take over the control of NSF in 1956, thus its new "left" leaning profile emerged. Due to its links with communist movement, DSF was infested with the presence of double agents/informers from the secret service.

First split
NSF saw its first major split in 1965, between the pro-China and pro-Moscow factions, better known as the NSF-Miraj Group and the NSF-Kazmi Group. While the NSF-Mairaj group supported the PPP, the NSF Kazmi group was the student arm of the National Awami Party (NAP), which today is the ANP. Because this particular faction hold most backward views within the progressive movement they soon loose the ground. Mr Ameer Haider Kazmi took position in PPP and his faction was liquidated.

NSF remain active in many Pakistani universities and colleges and won the elections of Students Unions. It played a major role in the popular student and labour uprising against the pro-US dictatorship of Field Marshal Ayub Khan in 1967 and 1968. NSF activists were among the first major supporters of future Pakistani Prime Minister Zulfiqar Ali Bhutto and his populist/Socialist Pakistan Peoples Party to advance the democratic process and to weaken the religious fundamentalists. One of the leading leaders of NSF, Meraj Muhammad Khan, was made a minister in Bhutto's first cabinet but both NSF and Meraj fell out with the Bhutto government in 1973 when Bhutto started to compromise on his socialist agenda.

Meraj Mohammad Khan remained president of NSF till 1967 and was later replaced by Rasheed Hassan Khan (student of Dow Medical College Karachi) in a council session held in Lahore in 1970.

NSF and People's Party
The following are the main reasons which contributed in withdrawing NSF support from the PPP.
 After PPP won the 1970 election and emerged as the single largest party in West Pakistan, it refused to acknowledge the mandate of the Awami League and their demands of greater autonomy and furthermore its policies regarding army operation in East Pakistan. The NSF and Mazdoor Kissan Party were the main left organizations who strongly opposed army operation against Bengalis.
 Differences further deepened when the NSF realized that Bhutto was backing off from his promises of radical economical and social changes which he made to students and the working class.
 Bhutto wanted to silence his dissidents so he cracked down on the workers and students.
The breaking point between Bhutto and the NSF came when Bhutto crushed the labour movement in Site on 7–8 June and in Landhi on 17–18 October in 1972. Several workers were killed and hundreds arrested. Rasheed Hassan Khan, then a Central President of NSF, had to go underground.

Consequently the NSF withdrew its support from the PPP and exposed Bhutto’s hypocrisy and opportunistic politics. Miraj Mohamed khan decided to remain in the PPP. Miraj was in view that it was the establishment that is trying to create conflicts among workers and that PPP and its policies are clean but he was proved wrong later. In years to come, the gulf of difference between ZA Bhutto and Meraj khan widened and Meraj Mohd Khan has no choice other than to leave PPP and form his own political organisation which he named as Qomi Mahaz-e-Azadi and his own faction of NSF. In mid 90's Miraj dissolved the Qomi Mahaz-e-Azadi and joined hand with cricketer turn politician Imran Khan and become Secretary General of PTI. He soon fell out with Khan and resigned from PTI. Once, a flamboyant student leader, Meraj fell into political isolation and he never regained his position as a representative leader of working class, a position he enjoyed once.

Afghan saur revolution
NSF saw another split in the 1980s when the USSR invaded Afghanistan. A majority faction condemned the soviet invasion, believed that revolution can not be exported. It was said that this will provide opportunity to imperialist powers to use religious extremist to curb progressive movements. Within Afghanistan various Marxist parties and groups were also divided over the issue. The small faction headed by Zahid Hussain took the position that criticizing so called 'Afghan saur revolution' would meant to be supporting the Mujahideen and see this as support to the Army Junta and dictatorship of General Zia-ul-Haq, playing into the hands of the US. That gave birth to a small dissident group headed by Zahid Hussain. This faction liquidated soon and member of this faction later joined various pro soviet groups or took positions in establishment.  These Opportunist wolves in sheeps’s clothing done damage to NSF in particular and to the progressive and workers movement in general.
Their position on this issue demonstrated that they failed to understand the imperialist strategy and their grasp of Marxism–Leninism-Mao Zedong Thought was fairly shallow. Revisionism and opportunism is always the main danger and obstacle to the advance of progressive movement.

Both betrayals from inside and the state crack down from outside were great setback to NSF and helped NSF's arch rivals, the right-wing, Islami Jamiat-e-Talaba (IJT), the student wing of the Jamaat-e-Islami, gain ground in the many student union elections held in the country's campuses in the 1970s and the 1980s. Till then the NSF had been sweeping student union elections in the 1950s, 1960s and 1970's. NSF was also affected by the creation of the Pakistan Peoples Party's student wing, the Peoples Students Federation (PSF) whose main purpose was to counter the NSF opposition to PPP in the early 1970s.

Ban on students' unions
Left leaning and progressive parties were persecuted and harassed by the right-wing dictatorship of President General Muhammad Zia-ul-Haq in the 1980s, dozens of NSF activists were arrested, tortured and expelled from the campuses. NSF joined alliance of progressive student parties that included DSF, PSF and many secular nationalist student groups like Baloch Students Federation in students' union elections across the country. NSF gained significant victories in students unions elections before they were banned by General Zia-ul-Huq in 1984.
After seeing the fate of Ayub Khan, Zia realised that student power needs to be curbed and crushed. He also wanted to pave his way to freely act as an American agent to fight a proxy war for America in Afghanistan, which eventually led the downfall of the Russian social Imperialism. On 9–11 February 1984, he banned students union starting from Sindh and than carrying out the orders to the rest of the country. Dow Medical College had always been the focus of the left politics and produced great student leaders from time to time. It was not a surprise that Dow Medical College was first to react to the ban on student political activities. At that particular time there were five elected unions in major campuses of Karachi, Dow Medical College (Khalid Anwer NSF panel), Sind Medical College (Rizwan Naeem, NSF panel)) and Dawood Engineering College (Rao Jamal Hamid, NSF panel) had elected Presidents from NSF. This was the popularity of NSF that Karachi University was the only institute with panel elected from right-wing Islami Jamiat-e-Talba. On the morning of the ban, NSF workers were running an admission campaign to facilitate newcomers to Dow Medical and Sind Medical College. NSF refused to accept the Ordinance of military dictator and immediately put black armbands and took students to the streets and ran a campaign for  100 days.  NSF was the only student organisation in Karachi which started the protest and all started from Dow Medical college. Islami Jamiat Talba joined later for face saving and in the broader interest of the students cause NSF had a combined meeting in Dow medical college where two organisations joined hands for the same cause. It must be reiterated that NSF kept the lead in the hand because of the brave nature of the workers and readiness to sacrifice for the cause. Dozens of NSF workers were arrested but were not deterred from the cause. During the process of protest, Sind Medical College was stormed by police and shelled with tear gas. NSF workers like Hakim Baloch, Humayun from SMC, Babar Asad, Kaleem and Shahid from Dawood Engineering College and Sohail Jaffar and Bashmi Mumtaz from NED and Iqbal, Riaz Pekar from Karachi University were few to name on the forefront of this movement. Thousands of students led by NSF protested across Pakistan, hundreds were put behind the bars and tortured. This movement was brutally suppressed by the dictator and in later years a new era of de-politicization of youth began.

After the ban on students' unions, right-wing student organisations were given free hand to operate and violently curb progressive students activism by the military dictator. NSF suffered heavily from the trend of violence once pioneered by IJT and later adopted by APMSO, and MSF which was intensified in the late 1980s and 1990s. Across the country NSF workers were banned from entering or holding their political activities on campuses.  Subsequently major campuses become no go areas for progressive students and NSF was overshadowed by pro establishment and other regional groups like APMSO and PSF and by Islamic fundamentalist student parties such as IJT and Pakistan Muslim League's student wing, Muslim Students Federation (MSF).
NSF suffered greatly by the state crackdown and violence in campuses and its presence were marginalized. NSF held its Eighteenth Central Council Session in 2000 in Lahore but in later year saw little presence in campuses.

Re-emergence
However, since early 2007 NSF is regrouping and has seen activities associated with re-organization taking along some of the old comrades like Mushtaq Chaudhri, Faheem Aamer, Abid Ali Shah, etc as well as new ones like Sabir Ali Haider.These comrades reorganized the People's Democratic Front (PDF) as well as NSF. NSF refused to take part in the Lawyers' Movement but firmly stood against the dictatorship of General Pervaiz Musharraf.

Despite the numerous errors and zig-zags in developing progressive movement, NSF has made important progress towards Re-organizational work and In Jan 2014 NSF central council session was held in Awan-e-Iqbal Lahore. Hundreds of students participated from all over Pakistan. In the two days council session, Sahir Azad Palejo from Sindh was elected as Central President and Ashiq Pathan from Hyderabad Sindh was elected as General Secretary. Participants vowed to continue their struggle and move beyond any ethnic, linguistic, and sectarian affiliations and unite at a national platform not just for better education but for People's Democracy and class consciousness to the people’s movements. A few years after the death of Dr Rasheed Hassan Khan, one of the founder of PDF the current leadership decided to abandon the PDF and on 24th January 2020 announced a new mass front, "Pakistan Inqlabi Party" with the thought that an organized mass front is important to unite the students, peasants, workers, and other white-collar proletariat. 
Pakistan Inqlabi Party have decided to wage "People Democratic Revolution" by taking part in electoral politics and have recently registered itself with the election commission of Pakistan.

References

Student societies in Pakistan
Students' federations of Pakistan
Student wings of political parties in Pakistan
Student organizations established in 1965